2 Places at the Same Time is a live album by the Washington, D.C.-based go-go band Experience Unlimited, released in 1986.

Track listing

Side A
"N.Y. Comes to Boogie" – 19:11

Side B
"Sho Nuff Bumpin'" – 14:33
"The Theme from Escape from del Go-Go" – 4:05

Personnel
 Gregory "Sugar Bear" Elliott – lead vocals, bass guitar
 William "Ju Ju" House – drums
 Genairo "Foxxy" Brown Foxx – congas, percussions
 Timothy "Short Tim" Glover – percussions
 Ivan Goff – keyboards
 Valentino "Tino" Jackson – electric guitar
 Darryel "Tidy Boy" Hayes – trumpet
 Michal "Go Go Mike" Taylor – trombone

References

External links
 "2 Places at the Same Time" at Discogs.com

1986 live albums
Experience Unlimited albums
Island Records live albums